Antoine-Denis Chaudet (3 March 1763 – 19 April 1810) was a French sculptor who worked in a neoclassical style.

Although mostly known as a sculptor, Chaudet did branch out in style and medium over the course of his career as an artist. Later in his life, he was involved in various collaborative art pieces. He collaborated on the 1801 print titled “Oeuvres de Jean Racine”, a major series of illustrations in Didot’s tribute to the author Racine that depict various famous scenes from the Bible. Chaudet also designed a hand fan made of paper, wood, and bone dating to the end of the 18th century alongside Pierre Francoise Leonard Fontaine and Charles Percier. Cataloged and held at the Louvre museum in Paris are numerous sketches of Chaudet’s that portray his early ideas for many of his most famous sculptures. There are several manuscript notes that have also survived that Chaudet used for notetaking and brainstorming during his commission work. He won the Prix de Rome in 1784 for his work titled Joseph Sold Into Slavery by his Brothers. He attended the Académie de France in Rome and was an active associate with the Académie Royale in 1789.

He married his pupil, the painter Jeanne-Elisabeth Chaudet.

Works
Peace (c. 1800 - 1810)
Busts of Emperor Napoleon and Empress Joséphine (exhibited 1811)
L'Amour (Cupid and the Butterfly), completed posthumously by Pierre Cartellier (1817), (Louvre Museum)
Joseph Sold by his Brothers (bas-relief, (1784)
The infant Oedipus and Phorbas (1799). Shown at the Salon of 1801, it was completed by Pierre Cartellier (1757–1831) and Louis Dupaty (1771–1825) after Chaudet's death.

References

       2. Art UK & York Museums Trust. (n.d.). Antoine Denis-Chaudet. Retrieved October 20, 2022, from https://artuk.org/discover/artists/chaudet-antoine-denis-17631810
       3. Emil Krén, Daniel Marx, & Web Gallery of Art. (n.d.). Biography of Chaudet, Antoine-Denis. Web Gallery of Art. Retrieved October 20, 2022, from https://www.wga.hu/bio_m/c/chaudet/biograph.html
       4. The Metropolitan Museum of Art. (n.d.). Antoine Denis Chaudet. Retrieved October 20, 2022, from https://www.metmuseum.org/art/collection/search?q=Antoine+Denis+Chaudet&sortBy=Relevance&pageSize=0

External links

English language:
Art Renewal Centre

French language:
Louvre Database: several works by Chaudet
Insecula
Bust of Napoleon
French Ministry of Culture database

1763 births
1810 deaths
18th-century French sculptors
French male sculptors
19th-century French sculptors
Prix de Rome for sculpture
19th-century French male artists
18th-century French male artists